Thyrgonidae or Thyrgonidai was a deme of ancient Attica, probably in the neighbourhood of Aphidna. Thyrgonidae, together with Aphidna, Perrhidae, and Titacidae, are said to have been removed from the phyle of Aeantis to another tribe. 

Its site is unlocated.

References

Populated places in ancient Attica
Former populated places in Greece
Demoi
Lost ancient cities and towns